The genus Clio is a taxonomic group of small floating sea snails, pelagic marine opisthobranch gastropod mollusks, the sole genus belonging to the family Cliidae

All species in this genus are characterised by a bilaterally symmetric, straight or adapically dorso-ventrally slightly curved shell, with an elliptical to triangular transverse section; protoconch clearly separated, globular or elliptical, frequently with a spine at the tip.
Subgenera are used for some species (e.g. Clio s.str., Balantium Bellardi, 1872, Bellardiclio Janssen, 2004), but most species cannot yet be assigned to one of these.

Numerous fossil species have been described.

Species
Recognised extant species are:

 Clio andreae (Boas, 1886)
 Distribution : north Atlantic, bathypelagic species.
 Clio antarctica Dall, 1908
 Clio bartletti van der Spoel, 1978
 Distribution: central Atlantic (Pleistocene fossil).
 Clio campylura (Tesch, 1948)
 Clio chaptalii J. E. Gray, 1850
 Distribution : tropical, circumglobal.
 Clio convexa convexa (Boas, 1886)
 Distribution: tropical, Indo-Pacific
 Clio convexa cyphosa Rampal, 2002
 Distribution: Red Sea and Gulf of Aden.
 Clio cuspidata (Bosc, 1802)
 Distribution : tropical/subtropical, circumglobal.
 † Clio oblonga Rampal, 1996
 Clio orthotheca (Tesch, 1904)
 Clio piatkowskii van der Spoel, Schalk & Bleeker, 1992
 Distribution: Antarctic.
 Clio polita Pelseneer, 1888
 Clio pyramidata Linnaeus, 1767
 Distribution : north Atlantic
 Height : to over 20 mm.
Formae:
 forma excisa van der Spoel, 1963
 forma lanceolata Lesueur, 1813 (tropical/subtropical, circumglobal)
 forma martensi (Pfeiffer, 1880) ??
 forma sulcata (Pfeffer, 1879)
The true status of these formae has to be evaluated, they might be real formae, subspecies, or even species.
 Clio recurva (Children, 1823)
 Distribution : tropical-subtropical, circumglobal (bathypelagic species)**
 Height: to over 30 mm
 Clio sulcata (Pfeffer, 1879)
Species brought into synonymy
 Clio australis: synonym of Clione limacina australis (Bruguière, 1792)
 Clio borealis (Pallas, 1774): synonym of Clione limacina (Phipps, 1774)
 Clio helicina Phipps, 1774: synonym of  Limacina helicina (Phipps, 1774)

References

 Vaught, K.C. (1989). A classification of the living Mollusca. American Malacologists: Melbourne, FL (USA). . XII, 195 pp
 Gofas, S.; Le Renard, J.; Bouchet, P. (2001). Mollusca, in: Costello, M.J. et al. (Ed.) (2001). European register of marine species: a check-list of the marine species in Europe and a bibliography of guides to their identification. Collection Patrimoines Naturels, 50: pp. 180–213
 Willan, R. (2009). Opisthobranchia (Mollusca). In: Gordon, D. (Ed.) (2009). New Zealand Inventory of Biodiversity. Volume One: Kingdom Animalia. 584 pp

Euopisthobranchia